Asaph the Jew ( Assaf HaYehudi), also known as Asaph ben Berechiah and Asaph the Physician ( Asaph HaRofe) is a figure mentioned in the ancient Jewish medical text the Sefer Refuot (lit. “Book of Medicines”). Thought by some to have been a Byzantine Jew and the earliest known Hebrew medical writer, he is however a rather uncertain figure who some have suggested is identifiable with the legendary mystical vizier Asif ibn Barkhiya of Arabian folklore, associated with King Solomon. Scholars in favor of Asaph’s historicity suggest that he might have lived somewhere between the 3rd and 7th Centuries CE, possibly in Byzantine Palaestina or Mesopotamia. However, the text itself from which Asaph is known seems to place him between Hippocrates and Pedanius Dioscorides, which if chronological would imply that he might have been thought to have been between the 5th Century BCE and 1st Century CE, though this is very uncertain. The Sefer Refuot, the only known historical Jewish text to mention Asaph (and which he may have written or contributed to), is the earliest known Hebrew medical work, and thus of great historical significance. The "Oath of Asaph" found in the text resembles the Hippocratic Oath and was taken by medical students at their graduation.

The Yitzhak Shamir Medical Center of Israel was named after him until 2017.

References

Jewish physicians of the Byzantine Empire
Classical humanists
Hebrew medicine
Medieval Jewish writers